Ole Søren Jensen (19 October 1919 – 14 February 1995) was a Danish rower. He competed at the 1948 Summer Olympics in London with Jørn Snogdahl in the men's coxless pair where they were eliminated in the semi-finals.

References

1919 births
1995 deaths
Danish male rowers
Olympic rowers of Denmark
Rowers at the 1948 Summer Olympics
Rowers from Copenhagen
European Rowing Championships medalists